Esteban Wilfredo Aránguiz Sánchez (born 24 September 1948) is a Chilean former football player who played as a midfielder for clubs in Chile, Mexico and the United States.

Club career
As a child, Aránguiz was with Defensor La Cisterna before joining Universidad de Chile youth system. Considered a historical player of Universidad de Chile, having played for the club in several seasons, he also played abroad for the Mexican club San Luis Potosí and the American club Miami Toros.

His last club was Santiago Wanderers in 1983.

International career
Aránguiz represented Chile at under-20 level in the 1967 South American Championship. At senior level, he made two appearances in two friendlies in 1970 and 1972.

Personal life
He was nicknamed Toro (Bull) or Torito (Little Bull).

References

External links

Esteban Aránguiz at PartidosdelaRoja.com 

1948 births
Living people
Footballers from Santiago
Chilean footballers
Chilean expatriate footballers
Chile international footballers
Chile under-20 international footballers
Universidad de Chile footballers
San Luis F.C. players
Miami Toros players
Santiago Wanderers footballers
Chilean Primera División players
Liga MX players
North American Soccer League (1968–1984) players
Chilean expatriate sportspeople in Mexico
Chilean expatriate sportspeople in the United States
Expatriate footballers in Mexico
Expatriate soccer players in the United States
Association football midfielders